Roxie is a town in Franklin County, Mississippi, United States. The population was 497 at the 2010 census, down from 569 at the 2000 census. This rural town developed with the construction of railroads in the area.

History

Roxie was founded in 1886 on a plot of farmland donated by John Quincy Adams Graves, who was the County Supervisor and a former soldier in the Regimental Band of the 4th Volunteer Mississippi Regiment during the Civil War. The town was named in honor of Graves' newborn daughter.

Roxie was incorporated in 1890.

The town was located at the crossroads of the Louisville, New Orleans and Texas Railway and the Yazoo and Mississippi Valley Railroad. Most of the early residents were employed by the railroads or worked in the logging industry and sawmills.

Roxie's children attended the Roxie School, whose motto was Home of the Tigers. In 1962, the high school portion of the school shut down, and all students from grades 9 to 12 were bussed to the new Franklin High School in Meadville. Roxie School continued for a few years after as an elementary school.

Geography
Roxie is located in western Franklin County.  U.S. Routes 84 and 98 pass through the town, leading east  to Meadville, the county seat, and west  to Natchez.

Demographics

As of the 2020 United States census, there were 469 people, 136 households, and 119 families residing in the town.

Recreation
Significant forests and recreation areas are found nearby, including:
 Clear Springs Recreation Area, listed on the National Register of Historic Places
 Homochitto National Forest
 Sandy Creek Wildlife Management Area

Education
Roxie is served by the Franklin County School District.

Notable people

 Cat Iron, blues singer and guitarist
 James Ford Seale, Ku Klux Klan member convicted of conspiracy and of the 1964 kidnappings of Henry Hezekiah Dee and Charles Eddie Moore, two young African-American men who were drowned by him and fellow conspirators.
 Richard Nathaniel Wright (1908 – 1960), African-American author of novels, short stories and non-fiction. Wright was the grandson of slaves, and much of his literature concerned racial themes, especially those involving the struggles of African-Americans during the late 19th to mid-20th centuries.

References

Towns in Franklin County, Mississippi
Towns in Mississippi
1886 establishments in Mississippi
Populated places established in 1886